Xestospiza is a genus containing two species of birds with cone-shaped bills that were described on the basis of fossils. They were possibly insectivores. It consists of the following:

 Cone-billed finch (Xestospiza conica) – prehistoric
 Ridge-billed finch (Xestospiza fastigialis) – prehistoric

References

External links
 Ornitaxa.com: Xestospiza

Hawaiian honeycreepers
Carduelinae
Endemic fauna of Hawaii
Late Quaternary prehistoric birds
Fossil taxa described in 1991
Extinct birds of Hawaii
Holocene extinctions
Bird genera
Higher-level bird taxa restricted to the Australasia-Pacific region
Taxa named by Helen F. James